Mark Putnam is an American academic administrator serving as the 21st president of Central College, a liberal arts college located in Pella, Iowa. He was appointed to the role July 1, 2010,

Early life and education 
Putnam was raised in Endicott, New York. He earned a Bachelor of Arts in philosophy from Nyack College. He then earned a Master of Education Master of Arts, and Doctor of Education from Teachers College, Columbia University.

Career 
Prior to his presidency appointment at Central College, Putnam served as senior vice president for executive affairs, chief of staff and chief planning officer at Northeastern University, where he held a succession of leadership roles over 10 years. He also held senior administrative appointments and positions at Connecticut College, Alliance Theological Seminary, Nyack College, and Pace University. He began his career in higher education as an admission counselor at Nyack College in 1983.

In 2010, Putnam was invited to participate in roundtable discussions in Washington, D.C., with the United States Department of Education, the Association of American Colleges and Universities and Global Perspective Institute Inc. Additionally, he accepted an invitation to participate in the Higher Education Working Group on Global Issues for the Council on Foreign Relations.

Personal life 
He and his wife Tammy live in Pella. They have two daughters.

References

External links
Central College
Central College President

People from Pella, Iowa
Heads of universities and colleges in the United States
Living people
Nyack College alumni
Teachers College, Columbia University alumni
Central College (Iowa) people
Year of birth missing (living people)